Miguel Muñiz Fernández (born 1 December 1990), commonly known as Miguelito, is a Spanish professional footballer who plays for Atlético Porcuna CF as an attacking midfielder.

Club career
Born in Huelva, Miguelito spent his first three seasons as a senior with Recreativo de Huelva's reserves. On 6 January 2010 he made his debut with the Andalusians' first team, against Atlético Madrid in the round of 16 of the Copa del Rey.

Miguelito played his first match in Segunda División on 2 January 2011, appearing as a late substitute in a 0–1 home loss to SD Huesca. On 25 July 2013, he was loaned to Segunda División B club Atlético Sanluqueño CF.

References

External links

1990 births
Living people
Footballers from Huelva
Spanish footballers
Association football midfielders
Segunda División players
Segunda División B players
Tercera División players
Atlético Onubense players
Recreativo de Huelva players
Atlético Sanluqueño CF players
Écija Balompié players
Marbella FC players
CF Lorca Deportiva players
CD San Roque de Lepe footballers